Lepidochrysops erici is a butterfly in the family Lycaenidae. It lives in northwestern Zambia. Ocimum plants host the larvae, and feed the adults while flowering in October.

Etymology
The species named for Eric Gardiner, son of the author, Alan Gardiner.

References

Butterflies described in 2003
Lepidochrysops
Endemic fauna of Zambia
Butterflies of Africa